Aankhen  means eyes in Hindi.

Aankhen is also the title of four films and a television series made in India.

Aankhen (1950 film) by Devendra Goel, stars Bharat Bhushan and Nalini Jaywant
Aankhen (1968 film) by Ramanand Sagar, stars Dharmendra and Mala Sinha
Aankhen (1993 film) by David Dhawan, stars Govinda and Chunky Pandey
Aankhen (2002 film) by Vipul Amrutlal Shah, stars Amitabh Bachchan and Akshay Kumar
Aankhen (TV series), premiered in 2001